Uncial 0197 (in the Gregory-Aland numbering), is a Greek uncial manuscript of the New Testament, dated paleographically to the 9th-century.

Description 
The codex contains a small parts of the Matthew 20:22-23,25-27; 22:30-32,34-37, on two parchment leaves (27 cm by 24.5 cm). It is written in one column per page, 12 lines per page, in very large uncial letters. It is a palimpsest, the lower text is in Syriac.

The Greek text of this codex is a representative of the Byzantine text-type. Aland placed it in Category V.

Currently it is dated by the INTF to the 9th-century.

The codex currently is housed at the Benedictine Abbey in Beuron.

See also 

 List of New Testament uncials
 Textual criticism

References

Further reading 

 Alban Dodd, Neue Palimpsest-Bruchstücke der griechischen Bibel; Zwei bekannte neugelesene Palimpsest-Bruchstücke einer St Galler Evangelienhandschrift, BZ 18 (1929), pp. 241-270. 

Palimpsests
Greek New Testament uncials
9th-century biblical manuscripts